Elections to the Madhya Pradesh Legislative Assembly were held in November 1993. The Indian National Congress won a majority of seats and Digvijaya Singh was sworn in as the new Chief Minister.

Result 
Source:

Elected Members

References

1993
1993
Madhya